Abdulla Al-Berik (born February 14, 1984) is a Qatari footballer. He is a former member of the Qatar national football team.

Career
He played six times for the Qatar national football team between 2006 and 2007.

Club career statistics
Statistics accurate as of 1 January 2012

2Includes Sheikh Jassem Cup.
3Includes AFC Champions League.

References

1984 births
Living people
Qatari footballers
Qatar international footballers
Umm Salal SC players
Al Sadd SC players
Al-Sailiya SC players
Al Ahli SC (Doha) players
Al-Khor SC players
Qatar Stars League players
Asian Games medalists in football
Footballers at the 2006 Asian Games
Asian Games gold medalists for Qatar
Association football defenders
Medalists at the 2006 Asian Games